Per Erik Magnus Grönwall (born 3 December 1987) is a Swedish hard rock and heavy metal singer. In 2009, he won the Swedish Idol reality television. During several of the shows, he received standing ovations from the jury for his performances. His first single, "Higher", sold gold on digital downloads after only three days. His debut album, self-titled Erik Grönwall, was released just ten days after the finals and debuted at number one on the Swedish albums chart and was certified platinum. In 2012, Grönwall joined rock band H.E.A.T as lead singer.

Altogether as a solo artist and band member, Grönwall has numerous top 40 hits. In 2018, he portrayed Simon Zealotes in the NBC live television concert production of Andrew Lloyd Webber and Tim Rice's Jesus Christ Superstar, in which he received Grammy nomination for in the Best Musical Theater Album category. He left H.E.A.T in 2020 after four albums with the band, and in 2022 joined Skid Row.

Career

Early life 
Erik was born in Knivsta, a small town about 30 miles north of Stockholm. He started his musical career by playing the guitar in a local punk/rock band. During high school, his focus went from mostly playing the guitar to singing. He became the lead singer and rhythm guitarist of the metalband RAID from north-eastern Stockholm and played with them until summer 2008. His future as a singer really took shape for the first time as he performed the leading role as Galileo Figaro in the Queen musical We Will Rock You, doing a number of shows at Oscarsteatern in Stockholm. Aggressive, charismatic hard rock frontmen such as Paul Stanley (of Kiss) and Freddie Mercury (of Queen) proved huge influences on Grönwall.

Swedish Idol 2009 
Grönwall first auditioned for Swedish Idol in 2007, but he did not reach the final auditions at that time. In 2009, he came back, and made quite an impression on the jury who reacted with a mix of crying and laughing after his audition singing Skid Row's "18 and Life". Grönwall performed several rock songs during the show (Kiss – "Shout It Out Loud", Iron Maiden – "Run to the Hills" and Queen – "The Show Must Go On"). He subsequently won the competition.

After Idol 

Immediately following Idol, Grönwall released his debut single, "Higher", which debuted at number one on Sverigetopplistan. One week later, his self-titled debut album "Erik Grönwall" was released, which included songs performed during the Idol shows. The album made it right into the number one spot on Sverigetopplistan. The album has been certified with platinum.

In 2009, Grönwall began working on his second studio album titled "Somewhere Between a Rock and a Hard Place" scheduled to be released on 2 June 2010. The lead single for the album, "Crash and Burn", was released on 19 April 2010. The album included songs written by Joey Tempest, Paul Stanley, Jörgen Elofsson, Nicke Borg, etc.

He made his acting debut in America in the live televised concert rendition of Andrew Lloyd Webber and Tim Rice's Jesus Christ Superstar as the apostle Simon Zealotes on 1 April 2018, Easter Sunday.

H.E.A.T 
Following the departure of former vocalist Kenny Leckremo in 2010, Grönwall joined Swedish rock band H.E.A.T as lead vocalist. In 2012, they released the album Address the Nation. It was listed number one on the rock charts and was well received by critics.  In 2013 H.E.A.T started recording their album, Tearing Down the Walls, which was released in 2014. The band subsequently started their tour with the album. They have played all over the world and been the opening act for bands like Scorpions. In late 2020, Grönwall left H.E.A.T after four albums with the band, and former vocalist Kenny Leckremo rejoined.

New Horizon 
In 2021, it was announced that Grönwall and former bandmate Jona Tee had a new project going, the power metal band New Horizon. Official audio of the track We Unite dropped online on 29 November 2021. Already signed to Frontiers Records, they will have their debut album Gate of the Gods out in early 2022. A video for the track was launched on 5 January 2022, featuring project guest musicians Robban Bäck (Mustasch, ex-Eclipse, ex-Sabaton, ex-Ammunition) and Dave Dalone (also former bandmate in H.E.A.T.) among others.

Skid Row
In March 2022 Grönwall announced that he would be joining American heavy metal band Skid Row as their new vocalist, replacing ZP Theart.

Discography

Solo 

 Erik Grönwall (2009)
 Somewhere Between a Rock and a Hard Place (2010)

H.E.A.T 

 Address the Nation (2012)
 Tearing Down the Walls (2014)
 Into the Great Unknown (2017)
 H.E.A.T. II (2020)

New Horizon 
 Gate of the Gods (2022)

Skid Row 
 The Gang’s All Here (2022)

Singles

Other charted songs

References

External links 

 Official website (archived)

1987 births
Living people
People from Knivsta Municipality
Idol (Swedish TV series) winners
21st-century Swedish singers
21st-century Swedish male singers
Skid Row (American band) members